Films produced in Sri Lanka in the 1940s.

1947

1948

1949

See also
 Cinema of Sri Lanka
 List of Sri Lankan films

1940s
Films
Sri Lanka